Empis insularis is a species of fly in the family Empididae. It is included in the subgenus Lissempis of the genus Empis. It is found in the  Palearctic.

References

Empis
Asilomorph flies of Europe
Insects described in 2003